"Passing By" is a song by South Korean singer-songwriter Roy Kim. It was released as a digital single on November 27, 2012, and distributed through CJ E&M Music. "Passing By" was the winning song of Mnet's talent competition series Superstar K4.

Release
Four days after winning Superstar K4, Kim's digital single "Passing By" was released. In its first week of release, the song charted in the top 10 of several music portals and charts in South Korea. It peaked at number six on the Gaon Digital Chart, and number nine on the now-defunct Billboard Korea K-Pop Hot 100. As of February 2013, "Passing By" has sold nearly 654,000 digital copies in Kim's native country.

Promotion
As "Passing By" was only released for Superstar K4, it was not heavily promoted. Aside from a performance on Superstar K4, Kim also performed the song at the 14th Mnet Asian Music Awards on November 30, 2012, followed by Mnet's M! Countdown on December 13 that same year.

Track listing

Charts and sales

Weekly charts

Monthly charts

Year-end charts

Sales

Release history

References

External links
 Roy Kim's official website 

2012 singles
2012 songs
Korean-language songs
South Korean songs